The Deutsches Schauspielhaus is a theatre in the St. Georg quarter of the city of Hamburg, Germany. It was established in 1901 by the renowned stage actress Franziska Ellmenreich.

Theatre managers

Notable actors 
Marco Albrecht,
Ingrid Andree, 
Maria Becker,
Ortrud Beginnen, 
Ehmi Bessel, 
Christa Berndl, 
Josef Bierbichler, 
Charles Brauer, 
Marion Breckwoldt, 
Ella Büchi, 
Max Eckard, 
Franziska Ellmenreich,
Judith Engel,
Sebastian Fischer,
Elisabeth Flickenschildt, 
Uwe Friedrichsen, 
Francis Fulton-Smith,
Ute Hannig,
Werner Hinz,
Hanne Hiob,  
Jutta Hoffmann, 
Pola Kinski,
Gustav Knuth, 
Felix Kramer,
Werner Krauß, 
Richard Lauffen, 
Ruth Leuwerik, 
Erwin Linder, 
Susanne Lothar,
Eduard Marks,  
Eva Mattes, 
Kyra Mladek, 
Magdalena Montezuma, 
Bernd Moss,
Dietmar Mues,
Ruth Niehaus, 
Joseph Offenbach, 
Michael Prelle,
Tilo Prückner, 
Wiebke Puls, 
Will Quadflieg, 
Hans Quest, 
Heinz Reincke, 
Hermann Schomberg, 
Annemarie Schradiek,
Jana Schulz,
Monique Schwitter,
Tristan Seith,
Cathrin Striebeck,
Solveig Thomas,
Andreas Tobias, 
Daniel Wahl, 
Anne Weber,
Laura de Weck, 
Antje Weisgerber, 
Ulrich Wildgruber, 
Maria Wimmer, 
Michael Wittenborn,
Samuel Weiss, 
Rosel Zech.

Notable directors 
Jan Bosse, 
Frank Castorf,  
Roberto Ciulli,
Jürgen Fehling, 
Dieter Giesing, 
Heiner Goebbels,
Gustaf Gründgens, 
Sebastian Hartmann,  
Ulrich Heising, 
Karin Henkel,
Hanne Hiob, 
Ivo van Hove,
Bruno Klimek,
Jacqueline Kornmüller, 
Johann Kresnik,  
Franz Xaver Kroetz,
Michel Laub,
Ingrid Lausund,  
Jan Lauwers, 
Albert Lippert, 
Christoph Marthaler,  
Wilfried Minks, 
Egon Monk, 
Christian Pade, 
Claus Peymann, 
René Pollesch,  
Stefan Pucher,  
Ute Rauwald,  
Rimini Protokoll,
Werner Schroeter,
Anselm Weber, 
Jossi Wieler,   
Peter Zadek.

References

External links 

 

Theatres in Hamburg
Buildings and structures in Hamburg-Mitte
Fellner & Helmer buildings
Tourist attractions in Hamburg
Theatres completed in 1900
1900 establishments in Germany